Ronald H. Tills (May 1, 1935 – February 4, 2018) was an American politician who served in the New York State Assembly from the 147th district from 1969 to 1978.

In August 2009, he was sentenced to 18 months in prison for transporting prostitutes across state lines. He died on February 4, 2018, in West Falls, New York at age 82.

References

1935 births
2018 deaths
Republican Party members of the New York State Assembly